Wilsons Peak (Aboriginal: Jirramen)  is a mountain on the border of New South Wales and Queensland, Australia. Much of which is covered in rainforest. It marks the intersection of the Great Dividing Range with the McPherson Range in the Scenic Rim region.

Local Aboriginals referred to the mountain as "Jirramen," which is Uragapul for knee. This is derived from the fact that the shape of the top of the mountain bears some resemblance to a human knee. The mountain was named by Captain Patrick Logan, the notoriously brutal commander of the Moreton Bay penal settlement, in honour of a colleague he served with at Moreton Bay.

The local Aboriginal tribe used the peak to send a series of smoke signals along the Main Range. The other peaks used for the series of signals are: Mount Roberts, Doubletop, and Mount Mitchell.

See also

Wilsons Peak Flora Reserve

References

Mountains of Queensland
South East Queensland